Stockinish Island is an uninhabited island off Harris, in the Outer Hebrides.

Geography and geology
Stockinish Island lies on the edge of the Minch, in the mouth of Loch Stockinish, south east of Harris. It is uninhabited and is now used for grazing. Loch an t-Sàile (loch of the brine), in the centre of the island, is an artificially dammed salt water loch, probably formerly a fish trap, and now used as a lobster pond.

Stockinish's geology is Lewisian gneiss.

Stockinish Island has two kyles (narrows), namely Caolas Beag to the north east and Caolas Mòr to the south west. It provides shelter to Stockinish Loch, which has a pier used by yachts during the summer.

To the south west is the small Eilean Leasait, and Stac nam Faoileag (seagull stack) is just to the south. There are a number of reefs to the south, which are above water at low tide.

Footnotes

Islands off Lewis and Harris
Harris, Outer Hebrides
Uninhabited islands of the Outer Hebrides